Philippos Thessaloniki B.C. (full name PAS Phillipos Thessaloniki B.C.) is an athletic basketball sports club, that is based in the Agios Fanourios neighborhood of Toumba, Thessaloniki, Greece.

History
The parent athletic club was founded in 1947. Its first name was Dafni, and the official colors of the team were green. Later, the team was renamed to Philippos, and adopted blue and white colors. During the 1988–89 season, Philippos played without any foreign players on its roster, and finished in last place in the top-tier level Greek Basket League, with just three victories. As a result, the team was relegated down to the Greek 2nd Division. During the 1990–91 season, Philippos again had three wins in the Greek Basket League, and was again relegated down to the Greek 2nd Division. In that season, Philippos was the fourth most important team in Thessaloniki, and they played their home games at Alexandreio Melathron Nick Galis Hall.

Dimitris Itoudis was Philippos' head coach during the 1997–98 season, in which the club finished in third place in the Greek 2nd Division. Two years later, the club was relegated down to the Greek 3rd Division. The club continued to decline in the following years, and in 2015, was relegated down to the Fourth Regional Division of Thessaloniki, which is the eighth-tier level of Greece.

Titles and honors
Greek 2nd Division North Group Champion: (1985–86)

Notable players 

 Chronis Daskalakis
 Christos Konstantinidis
 Dimitris Oikonomidis
 Babis Papadakis
 Pantelis Papaioakeim
 Vangelis Poulianitis
- Chris Papasarantou
 Herman Harried
 Boo Harvey

Head coaches 
 Dimitris Itoudis

References

Basketball teams in Greece
1947 establishments in Greece
Sports clubs in Thessaloniki